Space Precinct is a British television series that was first broadcast from 1994 to 1995 on Sky One and later on BBC Two from 1995 to 1996 in the UK, and in first-run syndication in the United States. Many US stations scheduled the show in late night time slots, which resulted in low ratings and contributed to its cancellation. The series was based on a 1986 55 minute pilot film entitled Space Police starring Shane Rimmer that was made but never aired.

The series was created by Gerry Anderson and was a mix of science fiction and police procedural that combined elements of many of Anderson's previous series such as Space: 1999, UFO and Thunderbirds.

Premise
The series is set in the year 2040 and stars American actor Ted Shackelford as former NYPD detective Patrick Brogan, now a lieutenant with the Demeter City police force on the planet Altor in the Epsilon Eridani system. Brogan and his partner Jack Haldane (played by Rob Youngblood) must adjust to living in another solar system, and investigating crimes being committed by aliens as well as humans. Also co-starring was Danish actress Simone Bendix as Officer Jane Castle, Haldane's love interest (Brogan was happily married with a wife, daughter and son who made the move to Demeter City with him). All other major characters were played by actors wearing complex make-up that also included elements of puppetry in order to depict the different alien races.

Characters

Brogan family
 Ted Shackelford as Lieutenant Patrick Brogan
 Nancy Paul as Sally Brogan
 Nick Klein as Matthew 'Matt' Brogan
 Megan Olive as Elizabeth 'Liz' Brogan

Demeter City Police

Humans
 Rob Youngblood as Officer Jack Haldane	
 Simone Bendix as Officer Jane Castle
 Joseph Mydell as Officer Lionel Carson

Creons 
 Jerome Willis as Captain Rexton Podly
 Lou Hirsch as Officer Silas Romek
 Richard James as Officer Hubble Orrin
 Kieron Jecchinis as the voice of Officer Hubble Orrin
 Tom Watt as Officer Beezle (four episodes)
 Gary Martin as the voice of Officer Beezle (four episodes)

Tarns
 Mary Woodvine as Officer Aurelia Took
 Colette Hiller as the voice of Officer Aurelia Took
 David Quilter as Sergeant Thorald Fredo

Others
 Gary Martin as the voice of Slomo - Station 88's Robot computer.

Other characters
 Rob Thirtle as Various Guest Aliens
 Leigh Tinkler as Various Guest Aliens
 Andy Dawson as Various Guest Aliens
 Joanna Berns as Various Guest Aliens
 Wayne Forester as Various Guest Aliens
 Alexa Rosewood as Various Guest Aliens
 Ken Whitfield as Various Guest Aliens
 Will Barton as Various Guest Aliens

Production
The series was one of the highest-budgeted shows Anderson produced, and was relatively popular in Europe. However, in a repeat of the situation that UFO encountered 25 years earlier, American broadcasters were uncertain what to make of the series that looked on the surface to be aimed at younger viewers, yet featured adult-oriented storylines and was usually played straight despite the bizarre storylines and make-up. As a result, Space Precinct was often scheduled in late-night/early morning time slots. The subsequent low ratings led to its cancellation after just one series.

Episodes

Pilot
The idea for Space Precinct predated the series by nearly a decade. In 1986 Anderson produced Space Police, a 55-minute pilot film that featured Anderson regular Shane Rimmer as Brogan. The series failed to sell at that time and the pilot was never broadcast.

The pilot, which has since circulated on video and online, features many differences. Brogan is a much older character than that played by Shackleford, and is a bachelor. His partner—and the only other apparently human character in the pilot—is Sgt. Cathy Costello, who is revealed to be a gynoid capable of shifting between human appearance and a more robotic look for dangerous missions. The aliens featured in the pilot are catlike rather than the more exotic aliens in Space Precinct. The only character other than Brogan to transfer from the pilot to the series is the robot Slo-Mo. The pilot, which is more comedic in nature than the somewhat serious series that followed, combined live action, full-size prosthetics, puppetry, and Supermacromation techniques.

Space Police (1986)

Home media
Space Precinct was released on DVD in the UK but, as of 2015, is out of print. It was released on DVD in North America on 23 November 2010. As of July 2017 Space Precinct is available in the US on streaming service Amazon Prime. In November 2018, the complete series was rereleased as a DVD box set in Region 2, by Network DVD.

References

External links

1990s British police procedural television series
1990s British science fiction television series
1994 British television series debuts
1995 British television series endings
AP Films
British television shows featuring puppetry
English-language television shows
Fiction set around Epsilon Eridani
Fiction set in 2040
First-run syndicated television programs in the United States
Flying cars in fiction
Sky UK original programming
Space Western television series
Television series about extraterrestrial life
Television series produced at Pinewood Studios
Television series set in the 2040s
Television series set on fictional planets